Hiram Belcher (February 23, 1790 – May 6, 1857) was a United States representative from Maine.  He was born in Hallowell, Massachusetts (now in Maine) on February 23, 1790.  He attended the rural schools and the local academy in town.  Belcher studied law, was admitted to the bar and commenced practice in Farmington in 1812.

Belcher was elected town clerk of the community and served from 1814 to 1819; member of the Maine House of Representatives in 1822, 1829, and 1832; served in the Maine State Senate. He was elected as a Whig to the Thirtieth Congress (March 4, 1847 – March 3, 1849). He was chairman of the Committee on Mileage. He was not a candidate for reelection.  He re-engaged in the practice of his profession until his death in Farmington on May 6, 1857.  His interment was in Center Meeting House Cemetery.

He was the son of Supply Belcher.

References

1790 births
1857 deaths
People from Farmington, Maine
Maine state senators
People from Hallowell, Maine
Whig Party members of the United States House of Representatives from Maine
19th-century American politicians